Hossein Fazeli (born 12 June 1993) is an Iranian footballer who plays as a winger for Saipa in the Persian Gulf Pro League.

Career

Fajr Sepasi
Fazeli made his debut for Fajr Sepasi in the Iran Pro League on 25 December 2012 against Zob Ahan Ishafan at the Foolad Shahr Stadium, coming on as a 74th minute is Jaber Ansari. He then made his first start for the side on 9 February 2013 against Damash playing until the 63rd minute.

Sepahan
Fazeli signed a five-year contract with Sepahan on 23 June 2014.

Career statistics

Club
Statistics accurate as of 23 February 2013

International career

U20
He was part of Iran U–20 during 2012 AFC U-19 Championship qualification, 2012 CIS Cup, 2012 AFF U-19 Youth Championship and 2012 AFC U-19 Championship.

U23
He invited to Iran U-23 training camp by Nelo Vingada to preparation for Incheon 2014 and 2016 AFC U-22 Championship (Summer Olympic qualification).

Honours

Club
Sepahan
Iran Pro League (1): 2014–15

References

External links 
 

1993 births
Living people
Association football forwards
Iranian footballers
Fajr Sepasi players
Iran under-20 international footballers
People from Nishapur